Ligamentum capitis may refer to:
 Ligamentum capitis costae intraarticulare, intra-articular ligament of head of rib
 Ligamentum capitis costae radiatum, radiate ligament of head of rib
 Ligamentum capitis femoris, ligament of head of femur
 Ligamentum capitis fibulae anterius, anterior ligament of the head of the fibula
 Ligamentum capitis fibulae posterius, posterior ligament of the head of the fibula